

John Maloney (1896–1971) was an American football and college basketball coach. He served as the head football coach at Georgetown University in 1923, compiling a record of 3–6. After coaching the school′s freshman basketball team, he also served as its head varsity basketball coach during the 1922–23 season after John O'Reilly, the Georgetown varsity basketball coach from 1914 to 1921, was unable to coach due to illness for a second straight season. During his single season as the varsity basketball coach before O'Reilly returned, Maloney tallied a mark of 8–3.

Head coaching record

Football

Basketball

References

1896 births
1971 deaths
American football quarterbacks
Georgetown Hoyas football coaches
Georgetown Hoyas football players
Georgetown Hoyas men's basketball coaches